Mom Luang Piyapas Bhirombhakdi (née Kridakorn  ; born 8 May 1962) is a Thai actress, primarily known for playing Queen Suriyothai in the 2001 movie The Legend of Suriyothai.

Piyapas is a great-granddaughter of Prince Nares Varariddhi, who was a son of King Mongkut. This distant royal descent is reflected by her title Mom Luang. Her father, M. R. Yongsawat Kridakorn, was a deputy director of the Crown Property Bureau. Her mother, Wiyada Kridakorn Na Ayudhya, was a lady-in-waiting to Queen Sirikit. Her nickname is "Khun Ton".

Piyapas went to Chulalongkorn University demonstration school and Chitralada School (the school attended by children of the Thai royal family). She completed a bachelor's degree in history from the Faculty of Education, Chulalongkorn University. She married Chutinant Bhirombhakdi, one of the heirs to the Boon Rawd Brewery fortune and executive vice-president of the Singha Corporation. They have two daughters and a son. Their eldest daughter is Chitpas Kridakorn, politician of the Democrat Party who has been a member of the Thai House of Representatives since 2019.

Work

Movie 
The Legend of Suriyothai (2001)

References

Piyapas Bhirombhakdi
Living people
1960s births
Piyapas Bhirombhakdi
Piyapas Bhirombhakdi
Piyapas Bhirombhakdi